Iaspis is a Neotropical genus of butterflies in the family Lycaenidae.

Species
Iaspis verania (Hewitson, 1868)
Iaspis ornata Austin & Johnson, 1996
Iaspis castitas (Druce, 1907)
Iaspis exiguus (Druce, 1907)
Iaspis talayra (Hewitson, 1868)
Iaspis castimonia (Druce, 1907)
Iaspis thabena (Hewitson, 1868)
Iaspis beera (Hewitson, 1870)
Iaspis grandis Austin & Johnson, 1996
Iaspis temesa (Hewitson, 1868)
Iaspis andersoni (Robbins, 2010)

Gallery

References

Eumaeini
Lycaenidae of South America
Lycaenidae genera